Tatipudi is a village and panchayat in Gantyada Mandal, Vizianagaram district in Andhra Pradesh, India. It is home to the Tatipudi Reservoir.
 This project is on Gosthani river. This was built in 1963-68.
Through this project drinking water is being provided to Visakhapatnam city. "Thatipudi Upliftment scheme" has been started and will be completed by 2023.

References

Villages in Vizianagaram district
Uttarandhra